The Poso is a river of Central Sulawesi on Sulawesi island, Indonesia, about 1600 km northeast of the capital Jakarta. The Poso is approximately 100 km long and flows from Lake Poso, about 2 km west of the town of Tentena to the city of Poso and then into the Gulf of Tomini.

Geography
The river flows in the central area of Sulawesi with predominantly tropical rainforest climate (designated as Af in the Köppen-Geiger climate classification). The wettest month is December, with an average of  rainfall, and the driest is September, with a  rainfall.

See also
List of rivers of Indonesia
List of rivers of Sulawesi

References

Sources 

 

Rivers of Central Sulawesi
Rivers of Indonesia